Ghoksadanga  is a neighbourhood and a gram panchayat in the Mathabhanga II CD block in the Mathabhanga subdivision of the Cooch Behar district  in the state of West Bengal, India.

Geography

Location
 
According to the map of the Mathabhanga II CD block on page 241 in the District Census Handbook, Koch Bihar, 2011 census, Ghoksadanga is shown as being a part of Bara Simulguri village/ mouza (MDDS PLCN 2011 / 308306).

Area overview
The map alongside shows the western part of the district. In Mekhliganj subdivision 9.91% of the population lives in the urban areas and 90.09% lives in the rural areas. In Mathabhanga subdivision 3.67% of the population, the lowest in the district, lives in the urban areas and 96.35% lives in the rural areas. The entire district forms the flat alluvial flood plains of mighty rivers.

Note: The map alongside presents some of the notable locations in the subdivisions. All places marked in the map are linked in the larger full screen map.

Civic administration

Police station
Ghoksadanga police station has jurisdiction over Mathabhanga II CD block.

Transport
Ghoksadanga railway station is on the Barauni-Guwahati Line of Northeast Frontier Railway.

Education
Ghoksadanga Birendra Mahavidyalaya was established in 2011. Affiliated with the  Cooch Behar Panchanan Barma University, it offers honours courses in Bengali, English, Sanskrit, political science, history and education, and a general course in arts.

Healthcare
Ghoksadanga Rural Hospital, with 30 beds at Ghoksadanga, is the major government medical facility in the Mathabhanga II CD block.

References

Villages in Cooch Behar district